2006 in Iraq marked the onset of sectarian war, making it the deadliest year of the war.

January 2006 
January 1: Two suicide car bombs kill one Iraqi soldier and wound 24 others north of Baghdad.
January 2: A suicide bomber kills seven people on a bus in Baquba.
January 4: A suicide bomber struck a Shiite funeral, killing 32 and wounding 40.
January 5: A suicide bomber in Kerbala detonated an explosive belt laced with ballbearings and a grenade, killing 51 and wounding 138. A suicide bomber in Ramadi blew himself up near a group of police and Army recruits, killed more than 60 and wounded around 70. Two other suicide car bombs explode in Baghdad.
January 6: A suicide bomber targeted an Interior Ministry patrol, and one policeman was killed in the explosion which wounded seven others.
January 9: Two suicide bombers disguised as police infiltrated the heavily fortified Interior Ministry compound in Baghdad and blow themselves up killing 29.
January 20: A suicide car bomber killed two U.S. soldiers in Haqlaniyah.
January 23: A suicide bomber kills three people and injures seven others near the Iranian embassy in Baghdad.

February 2006 
February 14: A suicide car bomber killed two U.S. marines near Qaim.
February 22: Al-Askari Mosque bombing, blamed by U.S. and Iraq on al Qaeda in Iraq leading to civil war.

March 2006 
March 10: A suicide truck bomber kills eight and wounds 11 at a checkpoint in Falluja.
March 14: A suicide bombing in Northern Iraq killed at least one person: America security contractor Chaz Benjamin Crawford.
March 27: A suicide bomber kills 30 to 40 people at a security-forces recruitment center in northern Iraq
March 29: Two suicide bombers on a mini-bus filled with explosives attempted to attack a police station in Haswa, south of Baghdad, but the bus exploded prematurely when police opened fire on it, wounding 11 policemen and a female bystander.
March 30: A suicide car bomber rammed a police convoy in west Baghdad’s Yarmouk neighborhood, killing one police commando and wounding three others. Two civilians also were hurt.

April 2006 

April 3: Ten die and 38 are wounded during a suicide truck bomb attack near a Shiite mosque in northeastern Baghdad
April 7: Two or three suicide bombers target the Baratha mosque in Baghdad, killing 85 people and wounding 160.
April 11: A suicide bomber kills an American soldier in Raweh.
April 17: A suicide bomber attacked a market in the town of Mahmudiya killing at least 13 people and wounding 19. Two or three suicide car bombers targeted the Government Center in Ramadi, wounding one U.S. Marine.

May 2006 

May 1: A suicide bomber attacked a US army patrol killing one Iraqi civilian and wounding two others in Iskandariya south of Baghdad.
May 2: Ten people die and six are injured when a suicide bomber explodes near a convoy carrying the governor of Anbar in central Ramadi.
May 3: Suicide bomber kills 16 and wounds 25 at a police recruitment center in Falluja.
May 4: A suicide bomber attacked a crowd of police officers and civilians outside the civil court building in Baghdad.
May 6: Suicide bomber kills three Iraqi soldiers at a base in Tikrit.
May 7: Suicide bomber kills five and wounds 18 in Karbala. A suicide bomber attacked an Iraqi army patrol as it left a base in the neighborhood of Azamiyah in Baghdad killing 10 people and wounding 15, most were Iraqi soldiers.
May 9: A suicide car bombing kills 22 and wounds 134 in Tal Afar.
May 14: A double suicide car bomb attack outside the Baghdad airport, near the Victory Base checkpoint, killing 14 people and wounding six others.
May 20: A suicide car bomber attacked a police station in Al-Qaim, killing five people and wounding ten. Victims were both civilians and policemen.
May 21: A suicide bomber kills 13 and wounds 18 in a restaurant in central Baghdad.
May 29: A suicide car bomber attacked a police patrol in Baghdad wounding two police and killing one.
May 30: A suicide bomber killed at least 12 people and wounded 36 in Hilla.

June 2006 

June 3: A suicide bomber attacked a market in Basra, killing 28 people and wounding 62 others.
June 11: A suicide car bomb explodes at an Iraqi Army checkpoint in Baquba, killing three Iraqi soldiers and wounding six.
June 12: A suicide bomber blew himself up at a gas station in Tal Afar killing four civilians and wounding more than 40.
June 13: As many as five suicide attacks hit Kirkuk on this day. In the central Quraya neighbourhood, a suicide car bomber struck the house of a senior police officer, Colonel Taher Salah al-Din, seriously wounding him and killing one of his bodyguards. Shortly afterwards, a suicide bomber in a car was shot by guards as he tried to attack Kirkuk's police headquarters. He blew himself up, killing two policemen. Across town a suicide car bomber blew himself up outside the offices of the Patriotic Union of Kurdistan, wounding two people. A second suicide car bomber then targeted the same building but was shot and killed by guards before he could detonate his bomb. Another suicide bomber struck a security building in the Wasit neighbourhood, wounding four civilians.
June 14: Police shot and killed a suicide bomber as he tried to attack a police checkpoint in Kirkuk.
June 16: A suicide bomber slips into a Shiite mosque in Baghdad, killing 11 and wounding 25 during Friday prayers.
June 17: A suicide bomber detonated his vehicle near a police checkpoint in Mahmoudiya, killing four people and injuring 15.
June 19: A suicide bomber killed four civilians and wounded 10 in an attack on an Iraqi army checkpoint in central Baghdad.
June 20: A suicide bomber kills two and injures two in a senior citizens' home in Basra.
June 24: A suicide bomber in Dhuluyia killed five Iraqi policemen.
June 25: A suicide bomber killed a police commando and wounded nine people in an attack on a police checkpoint in Baghdad's.
June 26: Two Iraqi police commandos die and four people are injured when a suicide bomber explodes at a military checkpoint in western Baghdad.
June 27: A suicide bomber attacked a gas station in Kirkuk killing at least three people and wounding 17.
June 28: A suicide car bomber attacked a Sunni mosque, near a market in Baqubah, killing three people.
June 29: A suicide car bomber kills five and wounds at least 31 during a wake for an Iraqi soldier in Kirkuk.

July 2006 

July 1: a suicide car bombing at a crowded market in Sadr City, a Shi'ite district of Baghdad, killed 62 people and wounded 114. A group calling themselves The Supporters of the Sunni People claimed responsibility for the attack. Also, a suicide bomber killed two policemen and wounded six people in an attack on a police patrol in Mosul.
July 3: A suicide car bomber attacked a security patrol in Baghdad, wounding two policemen, two soldiers, and one civilian.
July 5: A suicide car bomber attacked a police checkpoint in Mosul, killing two people, including a policeman.
July 6: A suicide bomber attacked two buses carrying Iranian pilgrims outside a Shi'ite Muslim shrine in Kufa killing 12 people and wounding 41, eight of the dead were Iranians.
July 10: A suicide bomber attacked the offices of the Kurdish PUK party in Kirkuk killing three and wounding eight. A suicide bomber attacked a crowd of civilians gathered at the site of an earlier explosion in Baghdad's Sadr City district killing 8 and wounding 41 people.
July 11: More than 50 people were killed in Baghdad in violence that included a double suicide bombing near busy entrances to the fortified Green Zone.
July 12: A suicide bomber blows himself up in a restaurant in southern Baghdad, killing seven and injuring 20.
July 13: A suicide bomber attacked a police patrol killing three people and wounding eight in Kirkuk. A suicide bomber attacked the city council of Abi Saida, north of Baghdad, killing six people and wounding three, including the head of the city council. A suicide car bomber attacked a police patrol in Mosul, killing two policemen and three civilians and wounding five, including two policemen.
July 14: A suicide bomber attacked a police patrol killing five people, including three civilians, in Mosul.
July 15: A suicide bomber attacked a police commando checkpoint in eastern Baghdad killing two police commandos and wounding four. A suicide car bomb attacked a police patrol in Baghdad, wounding six people, including two policemen.
July 16: A suicide bomber strikes a cafe in Tuz Khurmatu, killing 28 people.
July 18: A suicide car bomb kills 53 to 59 people and injures more than 100 at a market in Kufa. A suicide bomber attacked an Iraqi army patrol in Mosul killing four people and wounding two.
July 21: A suicide bomber killed six policemen and wounded 13 others near Falluja. A suicide bomber killed six policemen and wounded 13 others near Falluja. A suicide bomber broke into the home of As'ad Ali Yasin, the head of the Samarra local council, and blew himself up, killing himself but not harming Yasin or anybody else.
July 23: 32 to 34 are killed and 65 to 70 are wounded when a suicide bomber driving a minibus blows it up near a market in Sadr City, Baghdad.
July 24: A suicide bomber killed five Iraqi soldiers and wounded four in an attack on their patrol in Mosul. A suicide bomber attacked a Samarra Emergency Battalion checkpoint killing a civilian and wounding six policemen.
July 25: A suicide bomber attacked a house used by the Iraqi police in Samarra killing one person and wounding seven other people.
July 29: A suicide bomber attacked a police checkpoint near Qaim, killing himself and wounding two policemen.
July 30:A suicide car bomber attacked a police patrol in Mosul killing a policeman and wounding three other officers.
July 31: A suicide bomber attacked an Iraqi observation post outside Mosul killing four soldiers and wounding six.

August 2006 

August 1: A suicide car bomber kills at least 10 soldiers and four civilians and wounds 22 near an Iraqi army convoy in central Baghdad.
August 4: A suicide bomber in a pick-up truck blew up in an athletic field in Hadhar, killing 10 and wounding 12.
August 6: A suicide bomber attacks a funeral in central Tikrit, killing 15 people and injuring 17.
August 7: Nine soldiers die and 10 civilians are injured due to a suicide truck bomb in Samarra.
August 10: A suicide bomber struck a checkpoint near a shrine in Najaf, killing 35 and injuring 122.
August 13: Insurgents used a rocket, a car bomb, a suicide bomber on a motorcycle and two other devices to attack the Zafaraniya neighbourhood of southeastern Baghdad over the course of an hour. 57 people were killed, and almost 150 wounded.
August 15: A suicide truck bomber killed nine people and wounded 36 outside the headquarters of the Patriotic Union of Kurdistan in Mosul.
August 19: A suicide car bomber attacked a Shiite mosque in Baghdad's Doura district killing one person.
August 23: A suicide bomber attacked a police headquarters in Mosul killing one person and wounding ten. A suicide bomber dressed as a policeman wounded six policemen in an attack on a police station.
August 27: A suicide truck bomber killed two Kurdish guards and wounded 16 people in an attack on the party offices of the PUK. A suicide car double suicide bombing in Kirkuk near the home of Peyrut Talabani, a cousin of President Talabani, 9 people were killed and 22 wounded.
August 28: In Baghdad, 16 people died, including 13 policemen, when a suicide car bomber attacked a compound of the Iraqi interior ministry. In Baghdad, dozens of people were injured in the mid-morning blast outside the interior ministry. The ministry complex has been frequently targeted in the past and is heavily guarded. The Baghdad bomber struck as UK Defence Minister Des Browne was in the capital for talks with Iraqi officials. A suicide car bomber attacked a line of cars waiting for fuel at a gas station in the Dora district of Baghdad killing three and wounding 15 people.
August 29: A suicide car bombing somewhere in Iraq killed at least one person: American interpreter Saher Georges.
August 31: A suicide bomber attacked a gas station in eastern Baghdad killing 2 people and wounding 13.

September 2006 

September 3: A suicide bomber attacked a police patrol in Mosul killing two policemen and wounding three.
September 7: A suicide bomber attacked a police fuel depot in Baghdad killing 12 policemen. A suicide bomber attacked a police patrol killing 3 people and wounded 10 in a tunnel in the Bab al-Sharji district of Baghdad.
September 9: A suicide bomber killed one policeman and wounded 10 civilians after police at Baghdad's Adhamiya police station fired at the bombers car and it to detonated prematurely.
September 10: A suicide car bomber attacked a police raiding party killing 3 people and wounding 14, mostly policemen.
September 11: A suicide bomber blew himself up on a bus full of army recruits in Baghdad killing 16 people and wounding 7.
September 14: A suicide truck bomb hit a U.S. Army outpost in Baghdad killing three soldiers and wounding 25. A suicide bomber strapped himself with explosives and detonated them at an Iraq police checkpoint in Tal Afar, killing one police officer and wounding two others.
September 16: A suicide bomber attacked a U.S. patrol in Ramadi killing four civilians. A suicide bomber attacked a well-fortified police station in Baghdad's Doura district killing one civilian and wounding 22 others.
September 17: A suicide car bomber attacked a police checkpoint in Kirkuk killing only himself.
September 18: A suicide bomber attacked a police recruitment centre in Ramadi killing 13 people and wounding 10. A suicide bomber attacked a Tal Afar market killing at least 21 people and wounding 17.
September 19: A suicide bomber attacked a crowd of people who had gathered at the scene of an earlier bomb attack on an army base in Sharqat. At least 21 people were killed and 50 wounded in both attacks.
September 20: A suicide bomber attacked the house of Khalid al-Fulalli, a Sunni leader of the Bazi tribe, in Samarra, one child was killed and 26 people were wounded in the attack. A suicide truck bomber attacked a police checkpoint in the Doura district of Baghdad, killing seven police commandos and wounding 11 other, among them three civilians. A suicide bomber attacked a Tal Afar market killing at least 22 people and wounding 24.
September 24: A suicide bomber attacked a checkpoint in Tal Afar killing two Iraqi soldiers and wounded three, including a civilian.
September 25: A suicide bomber attacked a police checkpoint in Ramadi 7 policemen and wounding 7 others.
September 26: A suicide bomber attacked a new police station in Jurf al-Sakhar killing 2 policemen and wounding 4 policemen and 8 U.S. soldiers.
September 27: A suicide bomber attacked the Iraqi Communist Party's headquarters in Baghdad killing five people and wounding fifteen.
September 28: A suicide bomber attacked a checkpoint near the U.S. military base at Kirkuk airport, killing one policeman and wounding eight. A suicide bomber attacked an Iraqi army headquarters killing two civilians and wounding 25, including nine soldiers, in the Shaab district of Baghdad.
September 30: A suicide bomber attacked an Iraqi army checkpoint in Tal Afar killing two people and wounding 30.

October 2006 

October 3: A suicide bomber killed three and wounded 19 at a fish market in Baghdad.
October 4: A suicide car bomber struck an Iraqi police and army checkpoint in the northern city of Tal Afar, wounding three policemen, two soldiers and nine civilians. A suicide truck bomber blew himself up outside the Iraqi army headquarters in western Ramadi, police said. No one other than the bomber was killed but a number were wounded. In Ramadi, a car bomber rammed his vehicle into the entrance of a police station and wounded four.
October 7: A suicide car bomb killed 14 people, including four soldiers, and wounded 13, including nine civilians, at an Iraqi Army checkpoint in the northern Iraqi town of Tal Afar.
A suicide car bomber rammed a police checkpoint wounding six officers and commandos near the Jordanian border at Trebil.
October 12: In Kirkuk a suicide bomber rammed his car into an Iraqi Army checkpoint wounding one soldier. A suicide bomber attacked the army headquarters in Ramadi, there were no casualties.
October 13: A suicide bomber attacked a patrol in Mazraa killing three Iraqi soldiers.
October 15: Suicide bombers attacked at least six targets in Kirkuk killing 18 people and wounding more than 70 others. A suicide bomber in Tal Afar killed five people, including three policemen. A suicide bomber attacked a market in Al Qaim killing eight people.
October 17: A suicide car bomber targeting police commandos killed two police and wounded nine, including four civilians, in Baghdad's southern Saidiya district. Two suicide bombers attacked the police academy in Kirkuk, there were no casualties.
Six suicide bombers in vehicles, including one in a fuel truck, attacked Iraqi police and U.S. patrols, and insurgents fired mortars and clashed with police, the violence killed at least 20 people in Mosul.
October 21: A suicide bomber blew himself up on an Iraqi bus in Baghdad killing five passengers and wounding 15 others.
October 22: A suicide bomber killed six people and wounded 20 on Palestine Street in central Baghdad.
October 25: A suicide bomber attacked a hospital in Baquba killing two policemen.
October 26: A suicide bomber wounded two Iraqi soldiers in Tal Afar.
October 30: A suicide attacker blew himself up inside a police headquarters in Kirkuk, killing two policemen and a three-year-old girl and wounding 19, including 10 policemen. A double suicide attack hit an Iraqi army checkpoint at a border pass near Syria, killing six soldiers and wounding one.

November 2006 

November 1: Two suicide car bomb attacks on police positions north of Ramadi killed five policemen and wounded three.
November 7: A suicide bomber walked into a cafe in the Shi'ite Greyat district and blew himself up after dark, killing 17 people and wounding 20.
November 12: A suicide bomber walked into a police recruiting centre in Baghdad and blew himself up, killing 35 people and wounding 58.
November 18: A suicide car bomb at a police checkpoint in Haditha, west of Baghdad, killed one policeman and wounded another.
November 19: A suicide car bomb near a funeral procession killed three people and wounded 22 in the northern Iraqi city of Kirkuk.
November 20: A suicide car bomber exploded his vehicle near a police checkpoint and killed two people, including a policeman, and wounded six others, including four policemen, in Ramadi. A suicide car bomber rammed his car into a joint Iraqi police-army patrol and killed three soldiers and wounded four others, including a policeman, in a town west of Mosul.
November 23: Mortar rounds and five car bombs, at least three of which were suicide attacks, killed 215 in bombings in Baghdad's Sadr City.
November 24: A double suicide attack killed 22 people and wounded 45 at a market in a Shi'ite district in the northern city of Tal Afar, near the Syrian border.
A suicide car bomber targeting a police patrol killed a policeman and wounded seven people, including three policemen, in southwestern Baghdad. A suicide car bomber exploded near a police patrol, killing a policeman and wounding five civilians in al-Nidhal street in central Baghdad.

December 2006 

December 1: A suicide bomber attacked a U.S. patrol in Kirkuk killing two civilians.
December 3: A suicide bomber attacked a police patrol in Mosul killing two people. A suicide bomber attacked the convoy of a police official near Kirkuk killing three policemen.
December 6: A suicide bomber attacked a minibus in Baghdad killing three people.
December 9: A suicide bomber killed seven people in Karbala in an attack on a market.
December 11: A suicide bomber killed one police commando in Baghdad.
December 12: A suicide bomber struck a crowd of mostly poor Shiites in Baghdad on Tuesday, killing at least 71 people and wounding 220 after luring construction workers onto a pickup truck by offering them jobs as they were eating breakfast. A suicide bomber attacked a police checkpoint in Baghdad killing one person.
December 13: A double suicide attack on an Iraqi army base in Riyadh, near Kirkuk, killed seven soldiers and wounded 15. A double suicide attack on the headquarters of the Iraqi army's 2nd Battalion, near Kirkuk, killed 4 soldiers and wounded 10.
December 20: A suicide car bomber attacked a police checkpoint in Baghdad killing 11 people.
December 21: A suicide bomber attacked a police recruitment centre in Baghdad killing three police officers and 12 recruits. A suicide bomber attacked an Iraqi army checkpoint near Kirkuk killing one soldier. A suicide bomber killed two people in Baghdad.
December 24: A suicide bomber walked into a police station in the Iraqi town of Muqdadiya in Diyala province and detonated his explosives, killing at least seven police officers and wounding 30 more.
December 25: A suicide bomber killed three people and wounded 20 others when he blew himself up aboard a crowded bus in the Shi'ite Talibiya district in northeastern Baghdad.
December 28: A suicide bomber using a minibus attacked the offices of the KDP in Mosul, two people were killed and 19 were wounded.
December 29: A suicide bomber a Shi'ite mosque in Khalis killing 10 people.
December 30: A suicide bomber killed five people in Tal Afar.

References

 
2006